"Up All Night" is the second single from British group Take That's fifth studio album, The Circus (2008).

Song information
Released on 2 March 2009, it was the second single from the album The Circus. The single was only released in the UK and Ireland. The band performed "Up All Night" on Ant & Dec's Saturday Night Takeaway on 21 February 2009. It was the second live performance of the song, after they performed the song on ITV's Take That Come to Town. The band also performed the song on BBC's Comic Relief Does Top of the Pops special on 13 March 2009.

Use in media
The track featured on the New Year's Day series 3 episode 6 of Gavin & Stacey, in which James Corden and Mathew Horne could be seen miming the song playing on the radio whilst driving.

Critical reception

AllMusic described the song as a "cheerfully respectful stomp". BBC Music labelled the song a highlight, "utterly catchy" and with a "skip down the street chorus."

The Daily Mirror favourably likened the track to Simon & Garfunkel.

Chart performance
The song debuted on the UK Singles Chart on 14 February 2009 (Valentine's Day) at number 72, four weeks ahead of the release date of the single based purely on downloads. The single peaked at number 14, becoming the band's second single out of their recent six to fail to chart in the UK Top 10. However, it did become their 20th consecutive UK Top 20 single. In Ireland the song debuted on Thursday 26 February 2009 at number 29 based on downloads, a week before the official release. The single peaked at number 14.

Music video
The video for "Up All Night" was debuted on 27 January 2009, with Mark Owen on lead vocals. The video was directed by Daniel Wolfe, and features Take That performing at a street party in Croydon, with footage of them on the back of a lorry. Gary Barlow does not appear in the second half of the music video, filmed later in the dark, because his pregnant wife went into labour during filming.

Personnel
Mark Owen – lead vocals
Gary Barlow – backing vocals
Howard Donald – backing vocals
Jason Orange – backing vocals

Track listing
UK CD single
 "Up All Night" (radio mix) – 3:21
 "84" – 3:19

Charts

Weekly charts

Year-end charts

Certifications

References

Take That songs
2009 singles
Songs written by Gary Barlow
Songs written by Mark Owen
Songs written by Howard Donald
2008 songs
Song recordings produced by John Shanks
Polydor Records singles
Songs written by Jamie Norton
Songs written by Ben Mark